Pandanus pluriloculatus is a dioecious tree in the screwpine genus. It is endemic to Madagascar. The specific epithet, pluriloculatus, is given because this species has numerous locules in a compound ovary. Pandanus columnaris is now considered a synonym for P. luriloculatus.

Description
Pandanus pluriloculatus is a tree up to 22 m tall with a dark brown bark and a spiny trunk up to 30 cm in diameter. The crown of the tree is narrowly cylindric, with three spirals of large leaves at the top. Most of the trunk below the crown has many short branchlets with narrow leaves and fruit spikes. The leaves at the top of the tree are 1.35- 1.6 m long and 10--14 cm wide. The leaves of the lateral branchlets are shorter (71-83 cm long), and narrower (15- 16 mm wide). P. pluriloculatus usually has no prop roots.

Flowers and fruit
Flowering clusters arise at the tips of the lateral branchlets. They are set on a 3-sided stalk (peduncle) 8-14 cm long and 1 cm in diameter. The fruits (syncarps) are 5-9 cm long, 5–6.5 cm in diameter.  There are usually 3 or 4 fruits crowded together with the largest at the tip. They are generally egg-shaped, although the smaller ones may be nearly round.

Distribution and habitat
The trees are infrequent in coastal swampy forests. The species was first described in 1961, found along the east coast of Madagascar, in the Antalaha area. It has now been documented in  Antsiranana and Toamasina provinces and in the Mananara Nord and Masoala protected areas.

Taxonomy
Pandanus pluriloculatus is a member of the section Acanthostyla. Its closest relative is P. pseudobathiei Pic. Ser.

References

pluriloculatus